Débria M. Brown (26 October 1936 – 17 December 2001) was an American operatic mezzo-soprano who had an active international career that spanned five decades. She was part of the first generation of black opera singers to achieve wide success and is viewed as part of an instrumental group of performers who helped break down the barriers of racial prejudice in the opera world. She also worked occasionally as a dramatic actress on the stage and on television.

Education and early career 
Born in New Orleans, Brown was the daughter of the Reverend Bennett G. and Eunice Brown. She attended Xavier University of Louisiana (Bachelor of Music, 1958), where she sang Cherubino in the only production Norman Treigle directed, Le nozze di Figaro, in 1957. She later studied with Katherine Dunham in New York City through a scholarship provided by the John Hay Whitney Foundation.

In 1958, Brown made her professional opera debut with the New York City Opera in the title role of Georges Bizet's Carmen, opposite her mentor, Treigle, as Escamillo. She returned to the City Opera in 1961, when she created the role of Tituba in the world premiere of Robert Ward's The Crucible, opposite Chester Ludgin. In 1958 she made her Carnegie Hall debut singing the role of Amenofi in the American Opera Society's concert presentation of Gioachino Rossini's Mosè in Egitto with conductor Arnold Gamson, and Boris Christoff in the name part.

International success

From 1962–1965, Brown was a member of the Stadttheater Aachen, during which time she appeared as a guest artist at numerous opera houses in Germany. She was then committed to the Staatsoper Stuttgart from 1967–1970. In 1969, she appeared as Bess in George Gershwin's Porgy and Bess at the Vienna Volksoper. In 1971 and 1974, she made appearances at the Bregenzer Festspiele. In 1972–1973, she was a member of the Badisches Staatstheater Karlsruhe.

She performed at the Dubrovnik Summer Festival in 1973.

In 1992, Brown became a Professor of Voice and Artist in Residence at the University of Houston. She remained in that position until her death nine years later. At the time of her death she was still performing, and had further unfulfilled engagements with American opera companies scheduled in the next few seasons. Posthumously, her "live" 2001 recording of Dominick Argento's Casanova's Homecoming was released by Newport Classic.

References

Further reading 
 Blacks in Opera, An encyclopedia of people and companies, 1873-1993, by Eric Ledell Smith, McFarland & Company, Jefferson, NC (1995) 
 Who's Who among African Americans, Ninth edition, 1996/1997, Gale Research, Detroit (1996)
 Who's Who among African Americans, Tenth edition, 1998/1999, Gale Research, Detroit (1997)
 Who's Who among African Americans, 11th edition, Gale Research, Detroit (1998)
 Who's Who among African Americans, 12th edition, Gale Group, Detroit (1999)
 Who's Who among African Americans, 13th edition, Gale Group, Detroit (2000)
 Who's Who among African Americans, 14th edition, Gale Group, Detroit (2001)
 Who's Who among African Americans, 15th edition, Gale Group, Detroit (2002)
 Who's Who among African Americans, 16th edition, Gale Group, Detroit (2003)
 Who's Who among African Americans, 17th edition, Gale Group, Detroit (2004)
 Who's Who among Black Americans, Seventh edition, 1992/1993, Gale Research, Detroit (1992)
 Who's Who among Black Americans, Eighth edition, 1994/1995, Gale Research, Detroit (1994)

External links

  Dr Brown in "My Soul's Been Anchored."

1936 births
2001 deaths
20th-century African-American women singers
20th-century American women opera singers
African-American women opera singers
American operatic mezzo-sopranos
University of Houston faculty
Xavier University of Louisiana alumni
21st-century African-American women singers
21st-century American women opera singers
Musicians from New Orleans
Singers from Louisiana
Classical musicians from Louisiana
American women academics